Michael Wadding is a British television writer, director and producer. He began his career at the BBC with the 1999 Doctor Who documentaries Carnival of Monsters and Adventures in Space and Time. Wadding co-wrote and co-directed the 2006 series Nuremberg: Nazis on Trial.

Filmography
 1999 Carnival of Monsters & Adventures in Space and Time producer & director
 1999 Great Railway Journeys: Los Mochis to Veracruz  producer & director
 2001 The Real Shirley Bassey producer & director
 2002 Staying Up producer
 2003 Magic at War producer & director
 2006 Nuremberg: Nazis on Trial director & writer
 2008 Timewatch: Young Victoria producer & director
 2009 Who Do You Think You Are?: Kate Humble director

References

External links

Year of birth missing (living people)
Living people
British male screenwriters
British television producers